General elections were held in Denmark on 10 January 1984, after the opposition voted against the government's state budget bill. Although the Social Democratic Party remained the largest in the Folketing with 56 of the 179 seats, the Conservative People's Party achieved its best-ever result, gaining 16 seats. The coalition partners Venstre and the Christian People's Party also increased their representation, although the fourth government party, the Centre Democrats, lost seven of their 15 seats. Overall the coalition won three more seats, and Poul Schlüter continued as Prime Minister.

Voter turnout was 88% in Denmark proper, 61% in the Faroe Islands and 64% in Greenland.

Results

See also
List of members of the Folketing, 1984–1987

References

Elections in Denmark
Denmark
1984 elections in Denmark
January 1984 events in Europe